The Maryland–Bosnia and Herzegovina National Guard Partnership is one of 25 European partnerships that make-up the U.S. European Command State Partnership Program and one of 88 worldwide partnerships that make-up the National Guard State Partnership Program. The partnership was established in 2003 and has become integral to Bosnia and Herzegovina's post-war military integration and in their ongoing NATO accession process. The current focus is on a joint-deployment to Afghanistan, AT exchanges with key BiH units, and supporting BiH's NATO Partnership for Peace goals.

History

War ended in 1995 with Dayton Accord signing (still the constitutional document), army integrated in 2006
BiH given conditional NATO Membership Action Plan (MAP) in 2010 (have not met condition on defense property)
The Armed Forces are the most integrated, most effective national institution, but have been negatively affected by the political tumult.
Bosnia and Herzegovina is unique in the European AOR in its internal political paralysis due to fundamental differences between its constituent "ethnicities" over what the country should look like.  Though conflict is unlikely, in its current state, BiH is "virtually ungovernable" with no sign of agreement on reforms necessary to change that.

Partnership focus

Way forward
See through an embedded-deployment between MDNG Military Police and AFBiH Military Police (Staff Officers and PSD)
Expand the Unit Level Exchanges occurring between AFBiH and MDNG during unit ATs (increasing US-BiH interoperability)
Look to expand "whole-of-government" cooperation (i.e. Intl. Relations/Security Studies student exchanges)

2013 Planned Events
Multiple TCTs based on BiH PARP goals
Expanded slate of ULFs, at least 1 occurring in BiH

References

External links
The EUCOM State Partnership page for Maryland-Bosnia
Department of Defense News on the Maryland-Bosnia Partnership
EUCOM SPP
National Guard Bureau SPP
National Guard Bureau SPP News Archives

Bosnia and Herzegovina–United States military relations
Maryland National Guard
Military alliances involving the United States